Nandimithra SC is a Sri Lankan football club. They play in the topflight football league of Sri Lanka, the Sri Lanka Premier League.

Nandimithra finished fifth in Group B of the 2013 competition.

References

Football clubs in Sri Lanka